Orlin Orlando Peralta Gonzáles (born 12 February 1990 in Guanaja) is a Honduran footballer who plays as a left back for F.C. Motagua.

Club career
Peralta played for Vida from 2008 to 2013.  On 26 June 2013, he signed for F.C. Motagua.

International career
Peralta played for Honduras at the 2007 FIFA U-17 World Cup in Republic of Korea and represented the country at the 2012 Summer Olympics.

He made his senior debut for Honduras in a February 2012 FIFA World Cup qualification match against Cuba and has, as of April 2013, earned a total of 4 caps, scoring no goals. He has represented his country in 1 FIFA World Cup qualification match and played at the 2013 Copa Centroamericana.

References

External links

1990 births
Living people
People from Islas de la Bahía Department
Association football defenders
Honduran footballers
Honduras international footballers
Olympic footballers of Honduras
Footballers at the 2012 Summer Olympics
C.D.S. Vida players
F.C. Motagua players
Liga Nacional de Fútbol Profesional de Honduras players
2013 Copa Centroamericana players
2013 CONCACAF Gold Cup players